Gramada may refer to:

 Gramada, Bulgaria
 Gramada (Bujanovac), village in the municipality of Bujanovac, Serbia
 Gramada (mountain)
 Gramada (Svrljig), a mountain pass between Niš and Svrljig
 Ion Grămadă, Bukovinian Romanian writer